The Korean Art Gallery is an art museum situated on the south side of Kim Il-sung Square in Chung-guyok, Pyongyang, North Korea, which opened in 1948.

The building is 4 stories tall with 22 display rooms, an exhibition hall, a room for preservation of works and an artworks study room that exhibits a wide range of art, including oil painting, print, sculpture and industrial arts.

History 
The Korean Art Gallery first opened on 11 August 1948, and was later reconstructed in 2010. As of 2020, over 6 million people have visited the museum.

Layout 
The museum has 22 showrooms, an exhibition hall, several preservation rooms, and a study room. There are also tomb murals before the 4th century.

See also 

 List of museums in North Korea

References 

Museums in Pyongyang
1954 establishments in North Korea
Art museums established in 1954
20th-century architecture in North Korea